Central Station is a 1998 drama film directed by Walter Salles and starring Fernanda Montenegro, Marília Pêra and Vinícius de Oliveira. The screenplay, adapted by João Emanuel Carneiro and Marcos Bernstein from a story by its director Walter Salles, tells the story of a young boy's friendship with a jaded middle-aged woman. Montenegro's performance earned her international critical acclaim and a nomination for the Academy Award for Best Actress, while the film received a nomination for Best Foreign Language Film.

Plot

Dora is a retired schoolteacher who works at Rio de Janeiro's Central Station writing letters for illiterate customers for living. Embittered by life, she usually shows a lack of patience with customers and sometimes does not mail the letters that she writes, putting them in a drawer or even tearing them up instead. One of her customers is the mother of Josué, a poor 9-year-old boy who hopes to meet his unknown father someday. When she is killed in a bus accident just outside the train station and Josué is left homeless, Dora is forced to take him in; she initially traffics him to a corrupt couple, but later steals him back out of guilt.

Dora is initially reluctant to be responsible for the boy, but eventually decides to take a trip with him to Northeast Brazil in order to find his father.

Dora tries to leave Josué on the bus, but he follows her, forgetting his backpack containing Dora's money. Penniless, they are picked up by a kind, evangelical truck driver who abandons them when Dora encourages him to drink beer and then grows too friendly. Dora trades her watch for a ride to "Bom Jesus do Norte" (a fictionalized version of Cruzeiro do Nordeste, a district of Sertânia, Pernambuco). They find his father's address in Bom Jesus, but the current residents say he won a house in the lottery and now lives in the new settlements. With no money, Josué saves them from destitution by suggesting Dora write letters for the pilgrims who have arrived in Bom Jesus for a massive pilgrimage.

They take the bus to the settlements, but when they locate the address they have for Josué's father, they are told by the new residents that he no longer lives there and has disappeared. Josué tells Dora that he will wait for him, but Dora invites him to live with her. She calls Irene in Rio and asks her to sell her refrigerator, sofa and television. She says that she will call when she gets settled somewhere. After she hangs up, she learns there are no buses leaving until the next morning.

Isaías, one of Josué's half-brothers, is working on a roof next to the bus stop and learns that they are looking for his father, insisting Dora and Josué come to dinner. They return to his house and meet Moisés, Josué's other half-brother. Later, Isaías explains to Dora that their father married Ana, who he doesn't know is Josué's mother, after their mother died, and that nine years ago, while pregnant, Ana left him to live in Rio and never returned. Isaías asks Dora to read a letter that his father wrote to Ana when he disappeared, six months ago, in case she returned. In the letter, the boys' father explains that he has gone to Rio to find Ana and the son he never met. He promises to return, asks her to wait for him, and says they can all be together—himself, Ana, Isaías and Moisés. Dora pauses, looks at Josué and says, "and Josué, whom I can't wait to meet." Isaías and Josué are sure their father will return, but Moisés does not believe it.

The next morning, while they sleep, Dora sneaks out to catch the bus to Rio. She first leaves behind the letter from Jesus and the one from Ana - the one Dora carried with her from the Central Station but never mailed, expressing Ana's wish for the family to be reunited. Josué wakes up too late to prevent her departure. Dora writes a letter to Josué on the bus. Both are left with the photos they had taken to remember one another.

Cast
 Fernanda Montenegro as Isadora "Dora" Teixeira
 Vinícius de Oliveira as Josué Fontenele de Paiva
 Marília Pêra as Irene
 Soia Lira as Ana Fontenele
 Othon Bastos as César
 Otávio Augusto as Pedrão
 Stela Freitas as Yolanda
 Matheus Nachtergaele as Isaías Paiva
 Caio Junqueira as Moisés Paiva

Production 
Being a co-production between Brazil and France, the film was chosen by the French Ministry of Culture to receive resources of Fonds Sud Cinema, for their funding.

Release 
Central Station had its world premiere at a regional film festival in Switzerland on 16 January 1998. It was then screened at the Sundance Film Festival on 19 January 1998 and at the 48th Berlin International Film Festival on 14 February 1998.

The film was released in Brazil on 3 April 1998 in 36 theaters.

Reception
The film received critical acclaim. The film was an The New York Times Critics' Pick: according to Janet Maslin, "Mr. Salles directs simply and watchfully, with an eye that seems to penetrate all the characters"; the film features a "bravura performance by the Brazilian actress Fernanda Montenegro." According to Richard Schickel, the film is "an odyssey of simple problems, simple emotional discoveries, [and] a relationship full of knots that Salles permits to unwind in an unforced, unsentimental fashion. His imagery, like his storytelling, is clear, often unaffectedly lovely, and quietly, powerfully haunting.  Entertainment Weekly gave the film a grade of A–, concluding "In outline, Central Station recalls many of the bogusly sticky adult–kid bonding tales that have been the bane of foreign cinema for too long, but Salles, like De Sica and Renoir, displays a pure and unpatronizing feel for the poetry of broken lives. His movie is really about that most everyday of miracles: the rebirth of hope."

The film is ranked No. 57 in Empire magazine's "The 100 Best Films of World Cinema" in 2010.

Box office
The film grossed R$7.7 million (US$4.3 million) from 1.6 million admissions in Brazil, the highest-grossing Brazilian film released during the year.

It was the highest-grossing Brazilian film in the United States with a gross of $6.5 million, surpassing the $3 million earned by the 1976 film Dona Flor and Her Two Husbands. It was surpassed by the 2002 film City of God which grossed $7.5 million.

It grossed US$11.7 million in the rest of the world for a worldwide total of US$22,462,500.

Accolades

See also
 List of submissions to the 71st Academy Awards for Best Foreign Language Film
 List of Brazilian submissions for the Academy Award for Best Foreign Language Film

References

External links
 
 
 
 
 
 

1998 films
1998 independent films
1998 drama films
1990s drama road movies
1990s French films
1990s Portuguese-language films
Best Foreign Language Film BAFTA Award winners
Best Foreign Language Film Golden Globe winners
Best Picture APCA Award winners
Brazilian drama films
Films directed by Walter Salles
Films scored by Antônio Pinto
Films scored by Stewart Copeland
Films set in Rio de Janeiro (city)
Films shot in Rio de Janeiro (city)
French drama films
Golden Bear winners